Wahai Airport,  is an airport in Wahai on the northern coast of Seram Island, Maluku, Indonesia.

Airlines and destinations

References

Airports in Maluku